The 2020–21 NBL season was the 43rd season of the National Basketball League since its establishment in 1979. A total of nine teams contested in the 2020–21 season. The regular season was played between January and June 2021, followed by a post-season in June 2021.

Australian broadcast rights to the season were held by SBS Viceland in the second year of a two-year deal. All games were available live and free on streaming platforms such as SBS On Demand. ESPN also broadcast select games, including all games after 7.30pm AEDT. In New Zealand, Sky Sport were the official league broadcaster. The NBL continued broadcasting games online on Twitch in the second year of a two-year deal.

Teams
Nine teams competed in the 2020–21 season, with the Tasmania JackJumpers set to enter the league for the 2021–22 season.

During the off-season the Illawarra Hawks were renamed to The Hawks after the new ownership group announced they wanted to expand out from Illawarra and into the wider region. 

On 9 February 2021, the NBL reinstated the Illawarra Hawks name following an increase in support from the local community.

Stadiums and locations

Personnel and sponsorship

Player transactions 

Free agency negotiations were delayed until 15 July 2020, after the NBL and the Australian Basketball Players' Association postponed the original start date of 30 March 2020 due to the effects of the COVID-19 pandemic. On 17 April 2020, the NBL, the Australian Basketball Players' Association and the nine clubs reached an agreement in response to the financial pressure caused by the pandemic, which reduced the salaries of players signed for the 2020–21 season, lowered the full-time roster positions from 11 to 10 players (plus a Next Star slot) and from three import slots to two import slots.

Coaching transactions

Pre-season 

The pre-season games began on 13 November 2020, and ran until 10 January 2021.

Ladder

Regular season 

The regular season which was due to begin in early October, began on 15 January 2021 after it was delayed twice due to the COVID-19 pandemic. It consisted of 162 games spread across 21 rounds, with the final game being played on 8 June 2021.

Ladder

NBL Cup 

The 2020–21 season sees the introduction of the NBL Cup, which was a tournament based in Melbourne ran from 20 February to 14 March 2021.

Ladder 

Perth Wildcats won the inaugural NBL Cup trophy with a 7–1 record in eight games played.

Finals 

The 2021 NBL Finals was played in June 2021, consisting of two best-of-three semi-final series and a best-of-five Grand Final series. In the semi-finals, the higher seed hosted the first and third games. In the Grand Final, the higher seed usually hosts the first, third and fifth games. However, due to the border restrictions by the Western Australian state government, Perth Wildcats (the lower seed) hosted the first two games, while Melbourne United hosted the third game (and would have also hosted the fourth and fifth games had they not already won the series by the third game).

Playoff bracket

Awards

Regular season

Player of the Week

Awards Night
 Most Valuable Player (Andrew Gaze Trophy): Bryce Cotton (Perth Wildcats)
 Rookie of the Year: Josh Giddey (Adelaide 36ers)
 Best Defensive Player (Damian Martin Trophy): Justin Simon (Illawarra Hawks)
 Best Sixth Man: Jo Lual-Acuil (Melbourne United)
 Most Improved Player: Sam Froling (Illawarra Hawks)
 Fans MVP: Bryce Cotton (Perth Wildcats)
 Coach of the Year (Lindsay Gaze Trophy): Trevor Gleeson (Perth Wildcats)
 Executive of the Year: Mark Boyd (Melbourne United)
 Referee of the Year: Chris Reid
 Most Outstanding Media Coverage: Olgun Uluc (ESPN)
 GameTime by Kmart: Kyle Adnam (South East Melbourne Phoenix)
 All-NBL First Team: 
 Bryce Cotton (Perth Wildcats)
 Nathan Sobey (Brisbane Bullets)
 Tyler Harvey (Illawarra Hawks)
 John Mooney (Perth Wildcats)
 Jock Landale (Melbourne United)
 All-NBL Second Team: 
 Chris Goulding (Melbourne United)
 Casper Ware (Sydney Kings)
 Mitch McCarron (Melbourne United)
 Mitch Creek (South East Melbourne Phoenix)
 Finn Delany (New Zealand Breakers)

Post season

 Grand Final Series MVP (Larry Sengstock Medal): Jock Landale (Melbourne United)

References

External links

 
Australia
2020–21 in Australian basketball
2020 in New Zealand basketball
2021 in New Zealand basketball